In geometry, a set  in the Euclidean space  is called a star domain (or star-convex set, star-shaped set  or radially convex set) if there exists an  such that for all  the line segment from  to  lies in  This definition is immediately generalizable to any real, or complex, vector space.

A similar, but distinct, concept is that of a radial set.

Definition

where  for every vector 

A subset  of a vector space  is said to be   if for every  the closed interval

Such sets are closed related to Minkowski functionals.

Examples

 A line or a plane with a single point removed is not a star domain.
 Any non-empty convex set is a star domain. A set is convex if and only if it is a star domain with respect to any point in that set.
 A cross-shaped figure is a star domain but is not convex.
 A star-shaped polygon is a star domain whose boundary is a sequence of connected line segments.

Properties

 The closure of a star domain is a star domain, but the interior of a star domain is not necessarily a star domain.
 Every star domain is a contractible set, via a straight-line homotopy.  In particular, any star domain is a simply connected set.
 Every star domain, and only a star domain, can be "shrunken into itself"; that is, for every dilation ratio  the star domain can be dilated by a ratio  such that the dilated star domain is contained in the original star domain.
 The union and intersection of two star domains is not necessarily a star domain.

See also

References

 Ian Stewart, David Tall, Complex Analysis. Cambridge University Press, 1983, 
 C.R. Smith, A characterization of star-shaped sets, American Mathematical Monthly, Vol. 75, No. 4 (April 1968). p. 386,

External links

 

Convex analysis
Euclidean geometry
Functional analysis
Linear algebra